Thing of Beauty is a double album by the alternative rock band Volcano Suns. It was released in 1989 on SST Records. The album was the group's first to feature David Kleiler, Jr. as primary guitarist, with previous guitarist Chuck Hahn having exited the group.

The album sees the band functioning more democratically. Kleiler and bassist Bob Weston contribute lead vocals on several songs, while the band occasionally exchanges instruments; Peter Prescott's guitar playing setting a precedent for his focus on the instrument in his later project, Kustomized.

Track listing
Side One
"Barricade" 
"It's a Conspiracy" 
"Man Outstanding" 
"Courageous Stunts" 
"No Place"

Side Two
"Noodle on the Couch" 
"Ask the Pundits" 
"Arm and a Leg" 
"How to Breathe" 
"Rite of Way"

Side Three
"Soft Hit" 
"Malamondo" 
"Deeply Moved" 
"Now File" 
"Fill the Void"

Side Four
"Nightmare Country"
"Needles in the Camel's Eye"
"Kick Out the Jams" (CD/cassette only)
"Red Eye Express" (CD/cassette only)
"Mud"
"Veteran"
"Hang-Up"

References 

1989 albums
SST Records albums
Volcano Suns albums